CAMS–Basso Bikes is a British women's road bicycle racing team, which since 2020, has been registered as a UCI Women's Continental Team. The team was established in 2017.

Team roster

Major Results
2019
East-Cleveland Klondike Grand Prix, Anna Henderson
Lincoln Grand Prix, Rebecca Durrell
 Overall Tour of the Reservoir, Leah Dixon
Stage 1, Rebecca Durrell
Stage 2, Leah Dixon
Stockton Cycling Festival Grand Prix, Rebecca Durrell
UCI Track World Cup – Glasgow, Team Pursuit, Neah Evans

Continental & national champions
2019
 British Criterium, Rebecca Durrell
 European Track (Team Pursuit), Neah Evans

2022
 British Track (Scratch race), Ella Barnwell
 British Track (Omnium), Sophie Lewis

References

External links

UCI Women's Teams
Cycling teams based in the United Kingdom
Cycling teams established in 2017